The Barber National Institute (formerly the Barber Center) is a nonprofit, multi-faceted organization that provides services to more than 6,300 children, adults, and families who are faced with autism, intellectual disabilities, and behavioral health challenges. The institute’s central facility was founded in 1952 and is located in Erie, Pennsylvania. The Barber National Institute now employs more than 3,000 staff members throughout the state.

History

The Barber National Institute was founded in 1952 by the late Dr. Gertrude A. Barber. An educator and administrator in the Erie City School District in Erie, Pennsylvania, Dr. Barber, along with a small group of local teachers and parents, opened a one-classroom school in the local YMCA for children with developmental disabilities. 

As programs expanded, the City of Erie leased its former communicable disease hospital to the Barber Center in 1958.  The first permanent location for the programs, this site formed what has become the main campus in Erie. 

Construction began in 1968 for new administrative offices, a medical suite, cafeteria, and classrooms for middle and high school aged students. In 1969, a facility was opened in Corry, Pennsylvania to provide services for individuals in southern Erie County. The Barber Center’s first group homes were opened in 1973, after the downsizing of an institution in Venango County, PA. A satellite center was also opened in Girard, PA to accommodate those living in the western portion of Erie County. The Barber Center expanded to other areas of the state by opening group homes and support services in Philadelphia in 1990 and a day support program and residential group homes in the Pittsburgh area in 1999.

Current
In 2003, the Barber Center name was changed to what is now the Barber National Institute. It currently serves more than 6,300 children and adults annually in locations across Pennsylvania. The 11th largest employer in Erie County, the Barber National Institute has approximately 3,000 employees. The Institute provides services in a variety of fields including Autism, deaf and hearing impairment, behavioral health diagnosis, and intellectual disabilities.

Accreditations and memberships
In 2008, was named as a Pennsylvania “School of Excellence” by the National Association of Special Education Teachers
Nationally certified Trauma-Informed Care Community
Approved Private School, Pennsylvania Department of Education
Member of the Pennsylvania Early Learning Keys To Quality (Keystone Stars Program)

Services and programs

Infants and children 
An Autism Center for the diagnosis and treatment of Autism
An approved private school, the Elizabeth Lee Black Schoo serves children ages 3 – 21 with multiple intellectual and physical disabilities from 24 area school districts.
Bright Beginning, offering early intervention for infants and toddlers in their homes or child care centers that include physical, occupational, speech, and behavioral therapies
Happy Hearts Child Care and Preschool, featuring “inclusive” classrooms for typically developing children and students with disabilities
A preschool program for children who are deaf or hard of hearing
A Mental Health Partial Hospitalization Program, which integrates mental health services into a child’s educational program
A summer camp for children and teens with autism spectrum disorders

Adults
Employment services including Supported Employment, offering training and placement for adults with disabilities in jobs in the community
Adult Day Services –  Assists in vocational, recreational and social skills
ESO (Expanding Social Opportunities) – Recreational program in conjunction with typical peers at area colleges
Adult autism service that provides diagnosis, treatment and medication management

Residential services
Fifty-five community group homes throughout Erie County, Pennsylvania, as well as 36 homes in the Philadelphia area and six homes in suburban Pittsburgh
Life Sharing through Family Living, a program administered through the PA Department of Public Welfare which enables an adult with a disability to reside with a family provider.

Community services
Several types of therapies, psychological and behavioral services, for example, its Behavioral Health Rehabilitation Program, family based mental health services and targeted case management for children with autism and their families.

Location and facilities
Facilities are located in Erie, Corry, Girard, and Warren, PA; Residential group homes and adult day services are located in the Philadelphia and Pittsburgh regions.

Locations

References

External links
 Intellectual Disabilities & Behavioral Health - Barber National Institute www.barberinstitute.org (Northwest PA)
 Pittsburgh Region - Barber National Institute (Southwest PA)
 Philadelphia, Pennsylvania - Barber National Institute (Southeast PA)
 Autism Spectrum Connection
 Home
 Autism Speaks
 Autism Spectrum Disorder (ASD) | CDC
 AAMR.ORG
 CDC - ID Redirect - NCBDDD
 Donate Today | The Erie Community Foundation

Non-profit organizations based in Pennsylvania
Organizations established in 1952
1952 establishments in Pennsylvania
Erie, Pennsylvania